Jeffory Blackard is an entrepreneur and real estate developer working primarily in the Dallas-Fort Worth Metroplex. His developments include Adriatica, in which he intends to reproduce the look and feel of an old-world southern European village (most notably, an Adriatic coast Croatian village) in Texas. He primarily acts as Chief Executive Officer and founder of Blackard Companies.

Early life 
Jeff Blackard was born in Peoria, Illinois to Richard and Janice Blackard. Blackard was the state decathlon champion for 3 years running while in High School at Argenta-Oreana High School. Blackard was also the all-time leading scorer for his high school team and was recognized as a notable alumnus and in the school's hall of fame. He went to Northwestern University on a track and field scholarship which turned into a basketball scholarship during his sophomore year. Blackard was later recognized as one of Northwestern's 100 most notable graduates for his work in philanthropy and his theory of village evolution, Neoretroism.

Real Estate
After graduating from Northwestern University in 1981, Blackard moved south to Texas and worked for Cambridge Companies before being made partner at age 26 and eventually leaving to develop over 15,000 single homes through the completion of projects including Lakes on Legacy, Griffin Parc and Pirates Beach and Cove in Galveston, Texas. In addition to an early focus on master-planned communities, Blackard also developed projects including multi-family complexes, office parks, retail, restaurants and resorts totaling over $2 billion in asset creation.

After buying an interest in properties on the coast of Croatia, Blackard has focused much of his work on the evolution process of a village. Adriatica, a $350 million vertically integrated, mixed-use development, is located in McKinney, Texas. Adriatica takes its inspiration from the Croatian fishing village of Supetar on the island of Brač.

In the time since the Great Recession, in addition to advising other real estate developers on the creation of villages, Blackard has undertaken new villages like Entrada in Westlake, Texas, Barisi and the revitalization of North Beach in Corpus Christi, Texas, and Wolf Lakes in Georgetown, Texas.

Environmentalism 
Blackard received an environmental commendation from the United States Department of the Interior in association with the Delhide Cove Protection and Restoration Project that he undertook in the early 2000s.

Blackard also donated an island North of Lafitte's Cove in Galveston, renamed The Robert M. "Bob" Moore Wildlife Sanctuary, to the Galveston Bay Foundation in 2007 for conservation, protection and enhancing of the South Texas Wetlands.

In 2017, Blackard founded a company, Zero Global Waste, which operationalizes technology that converts municipal waste into a fuel the company calls an alternative to coal, called Edunite. The company is primarily active in Eastern Europe.

Political Activism
Blackard is also an independent political activist, who supported 2012 United States Presidential candidate Rick Santorum in response to his stalwartly Christian policy positions. Blackard worked to bring Santorum to his village in McKinney, Adriatica, shortly after a successful Super Tuesday in 2012 with Santorum leading in the polls. The Dallas Morning News quoted Bud Kennedy, longtime reporter for the Star Telegram and Dallas Morning News, saying of Blackard, "He helped plan Santorum's euphoric visit to staunchly evangelical Collin County." Santorum went on to become a business partner to Blackard in Zero Global Waste.

In 2017 Blackard was awarded the Friend of Croatia Award from the Association of Croatian American Professionals. He is a notable influencer in the politics of Croatia, having arranged meetings with high-level officials in American Politics, the president of Croatia and lobbying for a double taxation avoidance treaty.

Philanthropy 

In the mid 1990s Blackard started the organization Amazon Outreach, a Christian charity with whom he built a 90-foot river boat to provide medical services to underserved areas of the Amazon River Basin. Blackard has also traveled to over 50 countries with e3 Partners, a mission organization known for its "I am Second" campaign, including Ethiopia.

Personal 
Blackard resides East of Dallas on his ranch in Sulphur Springs, Texas with his wife Donna. He has five children. He is an Evangelical Christian.

References 

1959 births
Living people